Mantuan Downs is a rural locality in the Central Highlands Region, Queensland, Australia. In the  Mantuan Downs had a population of 31 people.

Geography 
Claude River rises in the north-west of the locality and flows in an easterly direction. The Nogao River enters the locality from Carnarvon Park to the south and flows north-eastly briefly forming part of the locality's eastern boundary before its confluence with the Claude River (its tributary) on the boundary, after which the Nogoa River exits to Nandowrie to the east.

The locality has the following ranges:

 Drummond Range
 Great Dividing Range

and the following mountains and valleys:

 Mount Caroline 
 Mount Vexation 

 Yarra Gorge
The Dawson Developmental Road enters the locality from Nandowrie in the east and continues west, exiting to Windeyer in the west.

History
The locality presumably takes its name from the Mantuan Downs pastoral property established by Thomas Mitchell. Mitchell explored and named the area in July 1846.

In the  Mantuan Downs had a population of 31 people.

In January 2020 the North Australian Pastoral Company announced it was purchasing Mantuan Downs, a large-scale cattle breeding and finishing property in Central Queensland. The  property consists of two pastoral leases, known as Mantuan Downs and Castlevale as well as the freehold Semper Idem.

Economy 
There are a number of homesteads in the locality:

 Albeni
 Beaucamp
 Castlevale
 Cungelella
 Goodliffe
 Mantuan Downs
 Mount Vexation
 Semper Idem

Transport 
There are a number of airstrips in the locality:

 Castlevale airstrip #1
 Castlevale airstrip #2
Goodliffe airstrip
 Mantuan Downs airstrip
Yandaburra airstrip

Education 
There are no schools in Mantuan Downs. The nearest primary school is Tresswell State School in Nandowrie, but it has been temporarily closed since 1 February 2020. There are no other nearby primary schools. There are no nearby secondary schools. The options are distance education and boarding schools.

References 

Central Highlands Region
Localities in Queensland